Paranjape or Paranjpe or Paranjpye is a surname found in Asia, South America, and the United States.

People 
Anand Paranjape (born 1970), Indian politician
Baburao Paranjpe (1922–1999), Indian politician
Jatin Paranjpe (born 1972), Indian cricketer
Kapil Hari Paranjape, Indian mathematician
Laxman Vasudev Paranjape (1877–1958), Indian nationalist
Makarand Paranjape (born 1960), Indian academic
Nitin Paranjpe (born 1963), Indian chief executive 
Prakash Vishvanath Paranjape (1947–2008), Indian politician
R. P. Paranjpye (1876–1966), Indian mathematician
Ramdas Paranjpe (1912-1989), Indian lawyer
Raja Paranjape (1910–1979), Indian actor
Sai Paranjpye (born 1938), Indian filmmaker
Shakuntala Paranjpye (1906–2000), Indian writer
Shivram Mahadev Paranjape (1864–1929), Marathi writer
Sunetra Paranjpe (born 1980), Indian cricketer
V. V. Paranjpe (died 2010), Indian diplomant
Vasoo Paranjape (1938–2021), Indian cricketer

Media 
Savita Damodar Paranjpe, 2018 Marathi film

References

See also 

Indian surnames
Marathi-language surnames